Tomei may refer to:

People with the surname Tomei, which is an Italian version of Thomas
Concetta Tomei, (born 1945), American actress
Louis Tomei (1910–1955), American racecar driver
Marisa Tomei, (born 1964), American actress

Other:
Tōmei Expressway, Japanese expressway connecting Tokyo with Nagoya
New Tōmei Expressway
Tomei Ningen, 1954 Japanese film, based on The Invisible Man
Stadio Claudio Tomei, football stadium